Phyllis Hodges Boyce (née Callow, July 24, 1936 – May 12, 2010) was an American actress, appearing in movies and television serials.  She was often credited as Phyllis Douglas.

Born the daughter of director Ridgeway Callow, Boyce was one of the last surviving cast members of Gone with the Wind, in which she appeared, at the age of two and uncredited, as Bonnie Blue Butler (along with Cammie King).  She also appeared in two episodes of the original Star Trek television series: "The Galileo Seven" and "The Way to Eden" and in a two-parter of the TV series Batman.

References

External links
 
 Phyllis Hodges Boyce Obituary at The Desert Sun, Palm Springs, Calif. (Retrieved May 14, 2010)

1936 births
2010 deaths
20th-century American actresses
Actresses from Los Angeles
American film actresses
American television actresses
21st-century American women